A sensory garden is specially designed for the visually impaired. The following are locations where large public sensory gardens are available for persons who are interested in visiting and learning about them:

Australia 

 Gold Coast Regional Botanic Gardens

Israel
Katie Manson Sensory Garden, Jerusalem

United States

Alabama 

 Enabling Garden at the Birmingham Botanical Gardens

California 
 Alice Keck Park Memorial Gardens

New York 
 Mendon Ponds Park

Pennsylvania 
 Wynnewood Valley Park Sensory Garden

Texas 
 Riverside Nature Center

Brazil  
 Rio de Janeiro Botanical Garden

Finland  
 Finnish Museum of Natural History

Italy 
 Orto Botanico Comunale di Lucca

New Zealand 
 Auckland Domain

United Kingdom 
 Bury St Edmunds Abbey
 Birmingham Botanical Gardens
 High Hazels Park

Sensory gardens